The 1980 United States Senate election in South Dakota was held on November 4, 1980. Incumbent Democratic U.S. Senator George McGovern ran for re-election to a fourth term, but was defeated by Republican James Abdnor.

Democratic primary

Candidates 
 George McGovern, incumbent U.S. Senator
 Larry Schumaker, Pro-Life activist

Results

Republican primary

Candidates 
 James Abdnor, U.S. Representative
 Dale Bell

Results

General election

Candidates 
 James Abdnor (R), U.S. Representative
 George McGovern (D), incumbent U.S. Senator

Campaign 
McGovern was one of several liberal Democratic U.S. senators targeted for defeat in 1980 by the National Conservative Political Action Committee (NCPAC), which put out a year's worth of negative portrayals of McGovern.  They and other anti-abortion groups especially focused on McGovern's support for pro-choice abortion laws.  McGovern faced a Democratic primary challenge for the first time, from an anti-abortion candidate.

Abdnor, a four-term incumbent congressman who held identical positions to McGovern on farm issues, was solidly conservative on national issues, and was well liked within the state.  Abdnor's campaign focused on both McGovern's liberal voting record and what it said was McGovern's lack of involvement in South Dakotan affairs.  McGovern made an issue of NCPAC's outside involvement, and that group eventually withdrew from the campaign after Abdnor denounced a letter they had sent out.  Far behind in the polls earlier, McGovern outspent Abdnor 2-to-1, hammered away at Abdnor's refusal to debate him (drawing attention to a slight speech defect Abdnor had), and, showing the comeback pattern of some of his past races in the state, closed the gap for a while.

However, McGovern was solidly defeated in the general election, receiving only 39 percent of the vote to Abdnor's 58 percent.  McGovern became one of many Democratic casualties in that year's Republican sweep, which became known as the "Reagan Revolution". McGovern was one of nine incumbent Senators to lose a general election that year, and his margin of defeat was by far the largest until Blanche Lincoln was unseated by John Boozman in 2010.

Results

See also 
 1980 United States Senate elections

References 

1980
South Dakota
1980 South Dakota elections